The 2011 Pacific hurricane season officially started on May 15, 2011 in the eastern Pacific, designated as the area east of 140°W, and on June 1, 2011 in the central Pacific, which is between the International Date Line and 140°W, and lasted until November 30, 2011. These dates typically limit the period of each year when most tropical cyclones form in the eastern Pacific basin. This timeline documents all the storm formations, strengthening, weakening, landfalls, extratropical transitions, as well as dissipation.

The first storm of the season, Hurricane Adrian formed off the southwest coast of Mexico. Thirteen tropical cyclones developed during the season. Most of these attained tropical storm status, and seven attained hurricane status. However this streak ended when Tropical Storm Fernanda formed and dissipated, never having reached hurricane strength.

Timeline of events

May 

May 15
 The 2011 East Pacific hurricane season officially begins.

June 

June 1
 The 2011 Central Pacific hurricane season officially begins.

June 7
 12:00 UTC (5:00 a.m.

June 8
 00:00 UTC (5:00 p.m.

June 9
 00:00 UTC (5:00 p.m.
 12:00 UTC (5:00 a.m.
 18:00 UTC (11:00 a.m.

June 10
 00:00 UTC (5:00 p.m.
 06:00 UTC (11:00 p.m.
 18:00 UTC (11:00 a.m.

June 11
 06:00 UTC (11:00 p.m.
 18:00 UTC (11:00 a.m.

June 12
 12:00 UTC (5:00 a.m.

June 19
 06:00 UTC (11:00 p.m.
 18:00 UTC (11:00 a.m.

June 20
 18:00 UTC (11:00 a.m.

June 21
 06:00 UTC (11:00 p.m.
 12:00 UTC (5:00 a.m.

June 22
 00:00 UTC (5:00 p.m.
 06:00 UTC (11:00 p.m.

July 

July 7
 1500 UTC (8 a.m. PDT) – Tropical Depression Three-E forms south of Mexico.

July 8
 0300 UTC (8 p.m. PDT July 7) – Tropical Depression Three-E strengthens to Tropical Storm Calvin.
 2100 UTC (2 p.m. PDT) – Tropical Storm Calvin strengthens to a Category 1 hurricane.

July 9
 1500 UTC (8 a.m. PDT) – Hurricane Calvin weakens to a tropical storm.

July 10
 0300 UTC (8 p.m. PDT July 9) – Tropical Storm Calvin degenerates into a remnant low.

July 17
 1500 UTC (8 a.m.
 1800 UTC (11 a.m. PDT) - Tropical Depression Four-E strengthens to Tropical Storm Dora.

July 20
 0300 UTC (8 p.m. PDT July 19) - Tropical Storm Dora strengthens to a Category 1 hurricane.
 1800 UTC (11 a.m. PDT) - Hurricane Dora strengthens to a Category 2 hurricane.
 2100 UTC (2 p.m. PDT) - Hurricane Dora strengthens into a Category 3 hurricane.

July 21
 0000 UTC (5 p.m. PDT July 20) - Hurricane Dora strengthens to a Category 4 hurricane.

July 22
 0300 UTC (8 p.m. PDT July 21) - Hurricane Dora weakens into a Category 3 hurricane.
 0900 UTC (2 a.m. PDT) - Hurricane Dora weakens into a Category 2 hurricane.
 1200 UTC (5 a.m. PDT) - Hurricane Dora weakens into a Category 1 hurricane.

July 23
 0000 UTC (5 p.m. PDT July 22) - Hurricane Dora weakens into a Tropical Storm.

July 24
 2100 UTC (2 p.m. PDT July 24) - Tropical Storm Dora degenerates into a remnant low.

July 31
 0600 UTC (11 p.m.
 1200 UTC (5 a.m. PDT) – Tropical Depression Five-E strengthens to Tropical Storm Eugene.

August 

August 1
 1800 UTC (11 a.m. PDT) – Tropical Storm Eugene strengthens to a Category 1 hurricane.

August 2
 1800 UTC (11 a.m. PDT) – Hurricane Eugene intensifies to a Category 2 hurricane.

August 3
 0600 UTC (11 p.m.
 1800 UTC (11 a.m. PDT) – Hurricane Eugene rapidly intensifies to a Category 4 hurricane.
 2100 UTC (2 p.m.

August 4
 0600 UTC (11 p.m. PDT August 3) – Hurricane Eugene rapidly weakens to a Category 3 hurricane.
 1800 UTC (11 a.m. PDT) – Hurricane Eugene rapidly weakens to a Category 2 hurricane.

August 5
 0000 UTC (5 p.m. PDT August 4) – Hurricane Eugene rapidly weakens further to a Category 1 hurricane.
 1200 UTC (11 a.m. PDT) – Hurricane Eugene is downgraded to a tropical storm.

August 6
 1200 UTC (11 a.m.

August 15

August 16
 1500 UTC (8 a.m. PDT) - Tropical Depression Six-E strengthens into Tropical Storm Fernanda.
 2100 UTC (2 p.m.

August 17
 0900 UTC (2 a.m. PDT) - Tropical Depression Seven-E strengthens into Tropical Storm Greg.

August 18
 0300 UTC (8 p.m. PDT) - Tropical Storm Greg strengthens into a Category 1 hurricane.

August 19
 1500 UTC (8 a.m. PDT) - Hurricane Greg weakens into a tropical storm.
 2100 UTC (11 a.m. HST) - Tropical Storm Fernanda weakens to a tropical depression.

August 20
 0300 UTC (5 p.m. HST August 19) - Tropical Depression Fernanda degenerates to a post-tropical cyclone.

August 21
 0300 UTC (8 p.m. PDT August 20) - Tropical Storm Greg weakens to a tropical depression.
 1500 UTC (8 a.m. PDT) - Tropical Depression Greg degenerates into a remnant low.

August 31
 1800 UTC (11 a.m.

September 

September 1
 0900 UTC (8 p.m. PDT August 31) - Tropical Depression Eight-E dissipates.

September 21
 0600 UTC (11 p.m. PDT September 20) - Tropical Depression Nine-E forms about 170 miles south-southeast of Puerto Escondido, Mexico.
 1200 UTC (5 a.m. PDT)- Tropical Depression Nine-E strengthens to Tropical Storm Hilary.

September 22
 1200 UTC (5 a.m. PDT) - Tropical Storm Hilary strengthens into a Category 1 hurricane.
 1800 UTC (11 a.m. PDT) - Hurricane Hilary strengthens into a Category 2 hurricane.
 0000 UTC (5 p.m. PDT) - Hurricane Hilary strengthens into a Category 3 hurricane.

September 23
 0600 UTC (11 p.m. PDT September 22) Hurricane Hilary strengthens into a Category 4 hurricane.
 1800 UTC (11 a.m. PDT) - Hurricane Hilary attains peak intensity with winds of 145 mph.

September 25
 0600 UTC (11 p.m. PDT September 24) - Hurricane Hilary weakens into a Category 3 hurricane.

September 26
 1800 UTC (11 a.m. PDT) - Hurricane Hilary restrengthens into a Category 4 hurricane.

September 27
 0600 UTC (11 p.m. PDT September 26) - Hurricane Hilary weakens into a Category 3 hurricane.
 1800 UTC (11 a.m. PDT) - Hurricane Hilary weakens into a Category 2 hurricane.

September 28
 0600 UTC (11 p.m. PDT September 27) - Hurricane Hilary weakens into a Category 1 hurricane.

September 29
 0600 UTC (11 p.m. PDT September 28) - Hurricane Hilary weakens into a tropical storm.

September 30
 0600 UTC (11 p.m. PDT September 29) - Tropical Storm Hilary weakens into a tropical depression.
 1200 UTC (5 a.m. PDT) - Tropical Depression Hilary dissipates into a remnant low.

October 

October 6
 0300 UTC (8 p.m.
 0600 UTC (11 p.m.
 1200 UTC (5 a.m. PDT) - Tropical Depression Eleven-E strengthens into Tropical Storm Irwin.
 2100 UTC (2 p.m. PDT) - Tropical Depression Ten-E strengthens into Tropical Storm Jova.

October 7
 0600 UTC (11 p.m. PDT October 6) - Tropical Storm Irwin strengthens into a Category 1 hurricane.
 1800 UTC (11 a.m. PDT) - Hurricane Irwin strengthens into a Category 2 hurricane.

October 8
 1800 UTC (11 a.m. PDT) - Hurricane Irwin weakens into a tropical storm.
 2100 UTC (2 p.m. PDT) - Tropical Storm Jova strengthens into a Category 1 hurricane.

October 10
 0300 UTC (8 p.m. PDT October 9) - Hurricane Jova strengthens into a Category 2 hurricane.
 0900 UTC (2 a.m. PDT) - Hurricane Jova strengthens into a Category 3 major hurricane.

October 12
 0700 UTC (12 a.m. PDT) - Hurricane Jova makes landfall in Jalisco, Mexico.
 0900 UTC (2 a.m. PDT) - Tropical Depression Twelve-E forms just south of the Gulf of Tehuantepec.

October 13
 0000 UTC (5 p.m. PDT October 12) - Tropical Storm Irwin weakens into a tropical depression.
 0300 UTC (8 p.m. PDT October 12) - Tropical Depression Jova degenerates into a remnant low.
 0300 UTC (8 p.m. PDT October 12) - Tropical Depression Twelve-E degenerates into a remnant low.
 1800 UTC (11 a.m. PDT) - Tropical Depression Irwin restrengthens into a tropical storm.

October 15
 1800 UTC (11 a.m. PDT) - Tropical Storm Irwin weakens into a tropical depression.

October 16
 1800 UTC (11 a.m. PDT) - Tropical Depression Irwin degenerates into a remnant low.

November 

November 18
 2100 UTC (1 p.m.

November 20
 2100 UTC (1 p.m. PST) - Tropical Depression Thirteen-E strengthens into Tropical Storm Kenneth.

November 21
 1500 UTC (7 a.m. PST) - Tropical Storm Kenneth strengthens into a Category 1 hurricane.

November 22
 0300 UTC (7 p.m. PST November 21) - Hurricane Kenneth strengthens into a Category 2 hurricane.
 0900 UTC (1 a.m. PST) - Hurricane Kenneth strengthens into a Category 3 hurricane.
 1500 UTC (7 a.m. PST) - Hurricane Kenneth strengthens into a Category 4 hurricane, becoming the strongest eastern Pacific hurricane in November on record.

November 23
 0900 UTC (1 a.m. PST) - Hurricane Kenneth weakens into a Category 2 hurricane.
 1500 UTC (7 a.m. PST) - Hurricane Kenneth weakens into a Category 1 hurricane.
 2100 UTC (1 p.m. PST) - Hurricane Kenneth weakens into a tropical storm.

November 25
 0900 UTC (1 a.m. PST) - Tropical Storm Kenneth weakens into a tropical depression.
 1500 UTC (7 a.m.

November 30
 The 2011 Pacific hurricane season officially ends.

See also 

 2011 Pacific hurricane season
 Pacific hurricane
 Timeline of the 2011 Atlantic hurricane season

References

External links 
 The National Hurricane Center's main page
 The Central Pacific Hurricane Center's main page

Pacific hurricane meteorological timelines
2011 Pacific hurricane season
Articles which contain graphical timelines
2011 EPac T